In Dreams is the third studio album by American progressive metal band After the Burial. It was released on November 23, 2010 through Sumerian Records. It is the first After the Burial album to feature music videos, which were produced for songs "Pendulum" and "Your Troubles Will Cease and Fortune Will Smile Upon You". This album also features more prominent clean vocals, sung by guitarist Trent Hafdahl and guest vocalist Ryan Jimenez.

Track listing

Chart positions

Personnel

After the Burial
 Anthony Notarmaso – lead vocals
 Trent Hafdahl – lead guitar, backing vocals, production
 Justin Lowe – rhythm guitar, programming, engineering, production
 Lerichard "Lee" Foral – bass
 Dan Carle – drums

Additional musicians
 Jocke Skog – vocals, programming, composing, mixing, mastering, production
 Rusty Cooley – guitar solo in "Encased in Ice"

Additional personnel
 Will Putney – vocal production
 Daniel McBride – artwork, layout
 Shawn Keith – A&R

References

Sumerian Records albums
2010 albums
After the Burial albums